The Mathilde Lefebvre letter (French: lettre de Mathilde Lefebvre) is a hoax document found in a bottle, purportedly written by Mathilde Lefebvre, a young girl from Liévin, France who died in the sinking of the Titanic, but in fact was forged by an anonymous forger.

In the spring of 2021, the French newspaper La Voix du Nord published an article entitled “Qui était Franck Lefebvre, l’Haillicourtois qui a perdu une partie de sa famille dans le naufrage du Titanic ?” (in French, Who was Franck Lefebvre, the Hailourtois who lost part of his family in the sinking of the Titanic ?) mentioning this document. After that, there were media reports about the letter. After several specialists had expressed doubts about the authenticity of the letter, it was revealed that it was a hoax.

Background

The Lefebvre family
Franck Lefebvre, a coal miner from Liévin in Pas-de-Calais, moved to Mystic, Iowa, United States in 1910. Once enough money was raised, he paid for his wife and children, who remained in France, for a trip aboard the Titanic, so that they could join him. None of the Lefebvre family aboard the Titanic survived.

Previous hoaxes 

The Titanic was not the only sunken ship from whom message bottles were purportedly found. In February 1893, the Naronic, a livestock carrier belonging to the White Star Line, disappeared during a crossing of the Atlantic Ocean while trying to reach New York City from Liverpool. At that time, ships were not yet equipped with radio and the only way to prevent a tragedy was to be seen by another ship. For several months, several ships were diverted from the company to try to find the Naronic, but without success. Only empty Naronic lifeboats were found. There is currently no explanation of what happened.

In March of the same year, six bottles containing messages attributed to the Naronic were found. Two were discovered on the east coast of the United States and reported a sinking on February 19. One of them referred to a collision with an iceberg during a snowstorm. Although the letters were signed, none of the names were on the official list of mariners on board. Apparently, they were written by people who were not aware of this information, based on media reports. Also, the messages found in the United Kingdom referred to icebergs or explosions, and the names in the messages simply did not exist. One of the messages referred to a false address.

Start of the Mathilde Lefebvre case

Discovery of the letter 
In 2017, a New Brunswicker contacted Antoine Resche, president of the French Titanic Association, to announce that he had found a bottle containing a letter in the Bay of Fundy. Dated April 1912, it was signed by Mathilde Lefebvre, who was travelling with her mother and her siblings in third class on the Titanic; all perished in the tragedy. The text read: “Je jette cette bouteille à la mer au milieu de l'Atlantique. nous devons arriver à New York dans quelques jours. Si quelqu'un la trouve, prévenez la famille Lefebvre à Liévin.” (In English: I am throwing this bottle into the sea in the middle of the Atlantic. We are due to arrive in New York in a few days. If anyone finds it, tell the Lefebvre family in Lievin.)

To verify the authenticity of the letter, Antoine Resche asked the person who discovered the letter to date the bottle, the ink and the paper.

Publication in La Voix Du Nord 
The case stalled until 2021, when a journalist from La Voix du Nord published an article entitled Qui était Franck Lefebvre, l’Haillicourtois qui a perdu une partie de sa famille dans le naufrage du Titanic ? (“Who was Franck Lefebvre, the Haillicourt man who lost part of his family in the sinking of the Titanic?”). From then on, the information was repeated in various news outlets, including France Bleu, L'indépendant, France Télévisions or RTL.

First doubts
Very quickly, several specialists expressed doubts about the authenticity of the letter. Several points intrigue researchers, both in terms of the condition of the message and the message itself.

Handwriting
According to Franck Gavard-Perret, professor of geography history and Nicolas Beaudry, from the Uqar Archaeology and Heritage Laboratory, the handwriting attributed to Mathilde Lefebvre isn't like that expected from people of the working classes of the time, especially when compared with the correspondence of the Poilu of the Great War. Psychomotrician Coraline Hausenblas conducted a study of writing and concluded that “identity theft was carried out in order to carry out a hoax around a historical subject attracting the attention and sympathy of the public”. Several forms of writing had been used: cursive writing, but also script, common in the Anglo-Saxon world, but not in France.

The text
The text does not contain much personal information, making it difficult to determine its authenticity. In the letter, Mathilde asks that anyone who finds her notify the Lefebvre family to Liévin. But Mathilde, her mother and her siblings were the last members of her family to leave Liévin to join the father of a family already settled in the United States. Why would she want a finder to contact the Lefebvre family in Liévin, when they no longer had close family there? Why, if she wanted to be contacted herself that her message had been found, didn’t she ask to send the letter to her destination, Mystic, Iowa?

According to Antoine Resche, this can be explained as follows: “If we start from the premise that the document is a forgery, it is very easy to explain: it is much more common to find the city of origin of the Lefebvre's Family than their destination...and a forger did not necessarily have this information”.

The bottle
The bottle used to convey the message is a small glass bottle, intended for liquors or perfumes. It is known that third class passengers often travelled with little luggage: such an empty bottle would therefore have had little room in the Lefebvre's luggage, which had to be limited to the essentials. According to Antoine Resche:“Such bottles would certainly not have been available in the third class dining room, which did not offer self-service liquors. A lone mother traveling with children who did not speak English would also have had a difficult time obtaining them from the crew”. Although researchers have stated that the bottle is “consistent with the early 20th century. You can find vintage bottles in an apothecary's shop, but that doesn't ensure that it was discarded in 1912.”

Wax
The bottle was supposed to have been in the water for over a century. In order for the message not to be affected by moisture, a very generous amount of wax would have had to be applied to the neck. It is difficult to explain how Mathilde could have obtained so much wax on board.

The place where the bottle was found
The bottle was found stranded in the Bay of Fundy, New Brunswick. According to ocean current specialists, if such a drift from the site of the sinking was not impossible, it remains highly improbable. This improbability must therefore be coupled with all the other improbabilities mentioned above.

Aftermath
In order to be able to prove with certainty that the recovered letter was indeed written by Mathilde Lefebvre, it would be necessary to have authentic elements of Mathilde Lefebvre’s handwriting in order to compare. However, there are no known samples of his handwriting.

In the end, different newspapers have admitted like Le Point that Mathilde Lefebvre's letter was a hoax.

The only consequence was to give visibility to a family involved in the Titanic disaster that until then had been little known.

References 

2017 documents
2017 hoaxes
2021 hoaxes
Hoaxes in Canada
Works about RMS Titanic
Letters (message)
Anonymous works
Literary forgeries